Micromyrtus racemosa is a plant species of the family Myrtaceae endemic to Western Australia.

It blooms between May and September producing white-cream-yellow-pink flowers.

It is found on breakaways, hills and ridges and in rocky areas in the Mid West, Wheatbelt and Goldfields-Esperance regions of Western Australia where it grows in gravelly soils over laterite or granite.

References

racemosa
Endemic flora of Western Australia
Myrtales of Australia
Rosids of Western Australia
Plants described in 1867
Taxa named by George Bentham